Dardavey is a village in Pain Khvaf Rural District, Sangan District, Khaf County, Razavi Khorasan Province, Iran. At the 2006 census, its population was 40, in 10 families. It lies near the border with Afghanistan, between Sangan and Taybad. The 1997 Qayen earthquake affected this part of Iran.

References 

Populated places in Khaf County